Guantanamo Diary may refer to:
 Guantanamo Diary (memoir)
 Guantanamo Diary (film)